The Interamici or Interamnici were a pre-Roman people or tribe, one of the Gallaeci tribes, living between some areas of modern southern Galicia (Spain) (in part of southern Ourense Province), and some areas of northern Trás-os-Montes, modern northeast Portugal. Their name means "Between Waters" (Between Rivers) because they lived between the southern banks of the Minius (Minho) and Sil rivers and the northern headwaters of the Laethes or Limia (Lima) and Tamica (Tâmega) rivers.

See also
Pre-Roman peoples of the Iberian Peninsula

References

External links
Detailed map of the Pre-Roman Peoples of Iberia (around 200 BC)

Ancient peoples of Portugal